Knots is a comedy film written by Greg Lombardo and Neil Turitz. Directed by Lombardo, the film was screened at the Gen Art Film Festival in 2004 and premiered on cable television in 2005. John Stamos, Michael Leydon Campbell and Tara Reid star.

Plot
The film tells the story of a man (Scott Cohen) who discovers his wife (Annabeth Gish) is having an affair, and the consequences of their resulting relationship with the mistress (Paulina Porizkova).

References
 "Knots" To Close Gen Art Fest. IndieWIRE Insider. April 5, 2004. Retrieved June 13, 2005.
 Premiere of an edited version of Knots on Lifetime .... All Things Annabeth. January 31, 2005. Retrieved June 14, 2005.

External links

2004 films
2000s sex comedy films
American sex comedy films
2004 comedy films
2000s American films
2000s English-language films